Paul Plishka (born August 28, 1941) is an American operatic bass.

Life and career
Plishka comes from Old Forge, Pennsylvania, and Paterson, New Jersey; his parents were American-born children of Ukrainian immigrants.  He attended Eastside High School and studied at Montclair State College and with Armen Boyajian (also the pedagogue of Marisa Galvany, Harry Theyard, Samuel Ramey, and Eric Owens), and made his operatic debut with the Paterson Lyric Opera, in 1961. From 1965 to 1967 he toured the United States in performances with the Metropolitan Opera National Company.

Plishka made his formal debut with the Metropolitan Opera as the Monk in La Gioconda, in 1967.  He became one of the company's leading basses, and has appeared in many other theatres, including the Teatro alla Scala and the New York City Opera (I puritani, 1981). He retired from the Metropolitan Opera after playing the Sacristan in Tosca, on the Saturday broadcast on January 28, 2012. He had performed at the Metropolitan Opera for forty-five years and in 1,642 performances, placing him at number ten on their official list of most-frequent performers, which dates back to the company's inception in 1883. There was a special tribute after Act I on stage, and on the air during the intermission.  In 2016 he was invited back to the Metropolitan Opera for five post-retirement performances as Benoît and Alcindoro in La bohème in April and May of that year, and 10 more in November, December, and January in the 2016/2017 season.

At La Scala, the bass appeared in La damnation de Faust (Concert Version, with Nicolai Gedda, 1975), Boris Godunov (as Pimenn, conducted by Claudio Abbado, 1981), Anna Bolena (a revival of the Luchino Visconti production, 1982), I lombardi (1986), Nabucco (conducted by Riccardo Muti, 1988), Turandot (with Ghena Dimitrova, 1988 and 1989), and I Capuleti e i Montecchi (1988 and 1989).  His last performance with the company was in 1992, in the Verdi Requiem.

He is a National Patron of Delta Omicron, an international professional music fraternity.

Paul Plishka's artistry was recognized in 1992 when he received the Pennsylvania Governor's Award for Excellence in the Arts and when, several years earlier, he was inducted into the Hall of Fame for Great American Opera Singers in a celebration at the Academy of Vocal Arts in Philadelphia.

However, Plishka's international artistic successes have been dampened by a life filled with personal tragedies.  In 1984, Plishka's younger brother, Dr Peter Plishka, was found dead in his Bronx apartment with a self-inflicted stab wound.  At the time, Dr Plishka, 33, was chief of children's services at the state-run Children's Psychiatric Center.  In 1991, Plishka's son Jeffrey was accused of the murder and rape of Laura Ronning, a crime of which he was eventually acquitted in 2010, and died in 2017. Plishka's first wife, Judith Ann Plishka, Jeffrey's mother, died in 2004.  Plishka is currently married to Sharon Thomas, a former resident stage director at the Met.  Another of Plishka's sons, Paul, Jr, also died, according to Pastor Protopresbyter Nestor Kowal of St Michael Ukrainian Orthodox Church in Scranton, Pennsylvania. Plishka's third son, Nicolai, died in 2021.

Abridged discography 
 Puccini: Tosca [as the Sacristan] (L.Price, Domingo, Milnes; Mehta, 1972)
 Donizetti: Anna Bolena (Sills, Verrett, Burrows; Rudel, 1972)
 Bellini: I puritani (Sills, Gedda, L.Quilico; Rudel, 1973)
 Bellini: Norma (Sills, Verrett, di Giuseppe; Levine, 1973)
 Gounod: Faust (Caballé, Aragall; Lombard, 1976)
 Massenet: Le Cid (Bumbry, Domingo; Queler, 1976) [live]
 Puccini: Turandot (Caballé, Freni, Carreras; Lombard, 1977)
 Verdi: Otello (Scotto, Domingo, Milnes; Levine, 1978)
 Bellini: Norma (Scotto, Troyanos, Giacomini; Levine, 1979)
 Puccini: La bohème (Scotto, Neblett, Kraus, Milnes; Levine, 1979)
 Verdi: Requiem (Caballé, Berini, Domingo; Mehta, 1980) [live]
 Verdi: La forza del destino (Freni, Domingo, Zancanaro; Muti, 1986)
 Mussourgsky: Boris Godunov (Vishnevskaya, Raimondi; Rostropovich, 1987)
 Puccini: La bohème (Réaux, Hadley, Hampson; Bernstein, 1988)
 "À Bordeaux" [Verdi/Moussorgsky] (Lombard, 1989)
 Verdi: Luisa Miller (Millo, Quivar, Domingo; Levine, 1991)
 Mozart: Le nozze di Figaro (Te Kanawa, Upshaw; Levine, 1992)
 "Sings Songs of Ukraine" (Hrynkiv, 1992)
 Beethoven: Ninth Symphony (R.Alexander, Quivar, Lakes; Previn, 1993)
 "Christmas with Paul Plishka" (Erickson, 1995)
 Stravinsky: The Rake's Progress (McNair, Bostridge; Ozawa, 1995)

Abridged videography 
 Puccini: La bohème (Scotto, Niska, Pavarotti, Wixell; Levine, Melano, 1977) [live]
 Weill: Aufstieg und Fall der Stadt Mahagonny (Stratas, Varnay, Cassilly, MacNeil; Levine, Dexter, 1979) [live]
 Verdi: Don Carlos (Scotto, Troyanos, Moldoveanu, Milnes, Hines; Levine, Dexter, 1980) [live]
 Rossini: La cenerentola (von Stade, Araiza; Abbado, Ponnelle, 1981)
 Donizetti: Lucia di Lammermoor (Sutherland, Kraus, Elvíra; Bonynge, Donnell, 1982) [live]
 Berlioz: Les troyens (Norman, Troyanos, Domingo; Levine, Melano, 1983) [live]
 Verdi: Simon Boccanegra (Tomowa-Sintow, Milnes; Levine, Capobianco, 1984) [live]
 Puccini: Turandot (Marton, Domingo; Levine, Zeffirelli, 1987) [live]
 Verdi: Luisa Miller (J.Anderson; Arena, Lassalle, 1988) [live]
 Verdi: Requiem (Sweet, Zajick, Pavarotti; Maazel, 1990) [live]
 "The Metropolitan Opera Gala 1991" (Levine, 1991) [live]
 Verdi: Falstaff (Freni, Horne; Levine, Zeffirelli/Mills, 1992) [live]
 Verdi: Stiffelio (Sweet, Domingo; Levine, del Monaco, 1993) [live]
 "James Levine's 25th Anniversary Metropolitan Opera Gala" (1996) [live]

References
 The Metropolitan Opera Encyclopedia, edited by David Hamilton, Simon and Schuster, 1987.

External links 

  Mr Plishka's official web-site: http://www.georgemartynuk.com/paul-plishka/
 Two Interviews with Paul Plishka by Bruce Duffie, November 24, 1981, and October 20, 1995

1941 births
Living people
Eastside High School (Paterson, New Jersey) alumni
People from Old Forge, Lackawanna County, Pennsylvania
People from Paterson, New Jersey
American people of Ukrainian descent
Singers from Pennsylvania
American operatic basses
Montclair State University alumni
20th-century American male opera singers
21st-century American male opera singers
Classical musicians from Pennsylvania
Singers from New Jersey
Classical musicians from New Jersey